Dame Sophie Frances Pascoe  (born 8 January 1993) is a New Zealand para-swimmer. She has represented New Zealand at four Summer Paralympic Games from 2008, winning a total of eleven gold medals, seven silver medals and one bronze medal, making her New Zealand's most successful Paralympian. She has also represented New Zealand at the Commonwealth Games.

Early life 
Born in Christchurch on 8 January 1993 to Garry and Jo Pascoe, Sophie grew up on a lifestyle block near Halswell on the south-western outskirts of the city. She has one older sister, Rebecca. On 23 September 1995, Pascoe was accidentally run over by her father on the family ride-on lawnmower. As a result of the accident, her left leg was amputated below the knee, while the rear of her right leg was left with severe scarring. She attended Halswell Primary School, and Lincoln High School in the nearby Christchurch satellite town of Lincoln.

Pascoe began swimming at the age of 7, and from the age of 8 up until 2022, was coached by Roly Crichton. She trains at the QEII swim club, which has been based at Jellie Park in Burnside since the facilities at Queen Elizabeth II Park were damaged in the 2011 Christchurch earthquake.

Swimming career 
Pascoe is classified S10 for freestyle, backstroke and butterfly, SB9 for breaststroke, and SM10 for individual medley.

At the 2008 Summer Paralympics, Pascoe won a gold and a silver medal for the 100 m breaststroke and 100 m butterfly respectively and later a gold for the women's 200 m individual medley. Pascoe then shared a gold medal for the 100 m backstroke when she drew with South African Shireen Sapiro. At 15 years of age, Pascoe was New Zealand's youngest athlete at the Paralympics, and the youngest ever New Zealander to win a medal.

Following the 2008 Paralympics, Pascoe was voted New Zealand's favourite Paralympian in a nationwide voting competition run by Mitsubishi Motors. For this she won a Mitsubishi VRX Outlander. Pascoe was made a Member of the New Zealand Order of Merit in the 2009 New Year's Honours, for her services to swimming. In February 2012, Pascoe became the inaugural winner of the Disabled Sportsperson of the Year award at the 2011 Halberg Awards.

At the 2012 Summer Paralympics, Pascoe competed in six events – the four in which she won medals at the 2008 Paralympics, plus the 50m freestyle (S10) and 100m freestyle (SM10) events. She successfully defended her 200 m individual medley (SM10) gold medal, breaking her own world record by four seconds with a time of 2:25.65. She also won gold medals in the 100 m butterfly (S10), where she bettered her silver at Beijing and in the process setting a new world record with a time of 1:04.43, and in the 100 m freestyle (S10), setting a new Paralympic record with a time of 1:00.89. Pascoe won silver medals in the 50 m freestyle (S10), 100 m backstroke (S10), and 100 m breaststroke (SB9).

In March 2013, Pascoe broke her own world record for the 50m butterfly at the New Zealand Swimming Championships in Auckland, setting a time of 29.21 seconds.

At the 2016 Summer Paralympics in Rio de Janeiro, Pascoe competed in five events, dropping the 100 m breaststroke SB9. She won gold medals in the 100 m backstroke, 100 m butterfly and 200 m individual medley, the latter in world record time. She also won silver medals in the 50 m freestyle and 100 m freestyle, both behind Canada's Aurélie Rivard. Her 50 m freestyle medal holds the distinction as the 200th medal won by New Zealand at the Paralympic Games (both summer and winter editions). Her success took her gold medal count to nine and her total medal count to 15, overtaking Eve Rimmer's eight gold medals and 14 total medals to become New Zealand's most successful Paralympian.

At the 2020 Summer Paralympics, she competed in the Women's 100 metre breaststroke SB8, winning the silver medal, and Women's 100 metre backstroke S9, winning the bronze medal.

In the 2022 New Year Honours, Pascoe was promoted to Dame Companion of the New Zealand Order of Merit, for services to swimming.

Personal bests

Major achievements 
2022: One gold medal at the 2022 Commonwealth Games (100 m freestyle)
2019: Four gold medals at the  World Para Swimming Championships in London.
2018: Two gold medals at the 2018 Commonwealth Games (4x50m individual medley, 100m Breaststroke)
2017: Winner of the Halberg Award for Disabled Sportsperson of the Year
2016: Five medals at the 2016 Paralympics, three gold and two silver.
2015: Winner of the Halberg Award for Disabled Sportsperson of the Year
2014: Two gold medals at the 2014 Commonwealth Games (4x50m individual medley, 100m Breaststroke)
2013: Winner of the Halberg Award for Disabled Sportsperson of the Year
2012: Three gold medals (100 m freestyle-S10, 100 m butterfly-S10, 200 m individual medley-SM10); three silver medals (50 m freestyle-S10, 100 m backstroke-S10, 100 m breaststroke-SB9) – International Paralympic Committee (IPC) – Paralympic Games, London, United Kingdom; Winner of the Halberg Award for Disabled Sportsperson of the Year. Named as an ambassador for Beef and Lamb New Zealand.
2011: Winner of the Halberg Award for Disabled Sportsperson of the Year
2010: Gold medal (100 m butterfly-S10); three silver medals (50 m freestyle-S10, 100 m backstroke-S10, 200 m individual medley-SM10); bronze medal (100 m breaststroke-SB9) – IPC World Championships, Eindhoven, Netherlands
2009: Four gold medals (100 m backstroke-S10, 100 m butterfly-S10, 100 m individual medley-SM10, 200 m individual medley-SM10); three bronze medals (100 m freestyle-S10, 400 m freestyle-S10, 100 m breaststroke-SB9) – IPC World Championships – 25 m, Rio de Janeiro, Brazil
2008: Three gold medals (100 m backstroke-S10, 100 m breaststroke-SB9, 200 m individual medley-SM10); Silver (100 m butterfly-S10) – International Paralympic Committee (IPC) – Paralympic Games, Beijing, China 
2006: Bronze (200 m individual medley-SM10) – IPC World Championships, Durban, South Africa

References

External links
  (archive)
 

|-

1993 births
Living people
New Zealand female swimmers
New Zealand amputees
Paralympic swimmers of New Zealand
S10-classified Paralympic swimmers
Dames Companion of the New Zealand Order of Merit
World record holders in paralympic swimming
Paralympic gold medalists for New Zealand
Paralympic silver medalists for New Zealand
Paralympic bronze medalists for New Zealand
Swimmers at the 2008 Summer Paralympics
Swimmers at the 2012 Summer Paralympics
Swimmers at the 2016 Summer Paralympics
Swimmers at the 2020 Summer Paralympics
Medalists at the 2008 Summer Paralympics
Medalists at the 2012 Summer Paralympics
Medalists at the 2016 Summer Paralympics
Medalists at the 2020 Summer Paralympics
Medalists at the World Para Swimming Championships
Commonwealth Games gold medallists for New Zealand
Commonwealth Games medallists in swimming
Swimmers at the 2018 Commonwealth Games
Swimmers from Christchurch
People educated at Lincoln High School, New Zealand
Paralympic medalists in swimming
Sporting dames
Swimmers at the 2022 Commonwealth Games
20th-century New Zealand women
21st-century New Zealand women
Medallists at the 2018 Commonwealth Games
Medallists at the 2022 Commonwealth Games